Gilberto Gerhardt (born 5 June 1949) is a Brazilian rower. He competed in the men's double sculls event at the 1976 Summer Olympics.

References

1949 births
Living people
Brazilian male rowers
Olympic rowers of Brazil
Rowers at the 1976 Summer Olympics
Place of birth missing (living people)
Pan American Games medalists in rowing
Pan American Games gold medalists for Brazil
Pan American Games silver medalists for Brazil
Rowers at the 1975 Pan American Games
Rowers at the 1979 Pan American Games